The Gambling Terror is a 1937 American Western film directed by Sam Newfield and starring Johnny Mack Brown, Iris Meredith and Charles King.

Plot
A town is effectively terrorised by a protection racket with no one knowing who their leader is. Their only opposition is the editor of a local newspaper. When the editor's young son is caught listening to a pair to thugs victimising a farmer the thugs threaten to beat him to tell them what he heard. They are thwarted and beat up by Jeff Hayes, a gambler who is passing through town. When they threaten retribution to Jeff, he laughs in their face, telling them that anyone who'd horsewhip a child wouldn't be too much for a man to worry about.

The previous gambling in the town saloon was stopped by the protection racket when they wouldn't pay tribute. Jeff refuses to pay and gives the now frightened thugs a sample of his quick draw and expert marksmanship with his pair of six shooters. Jeff is cheered by the town, but despised because he is a gambler by the editor's daughter. The editor wants Jeff to join his vigilantes, but Jeff warns the editor that you don't fight bushwhackers by riding on the skyline.

Brett, the overseer of the thugs proposes that as Jeff is a gambler, he'd go for the most profit, in his case a large percentage of the proceeds of the operation. As insurance, the thugs kidnap the editor's son.

Partial cast
 Johnny Mack Brown as Jeff Hayes  
 Iris Meredith as Betty Garret 
 Charles King as Brett 
 Dick Curtis as Dirk - Brett's Henchman  
 Ted Adams as Sheriff  
 Horace Murphy as Missouri Bill, Printer's Devil  
 Earl Dwire as Homer Bradley  
 Frank Ball as Garret - Weekly Star Editor 
 Bobby Nelson as Jerry Garret  
 Lloyd Ingraham as Old Man  
 Emma Tansey as Old Woman  
 Budd Buster as Shorty

References

Bibliography
 Pitts, Michael R. Western Movies: A Guide to 5,105 Feature Films. McFarland, 2012.

External links
 

1937 films
1937 Western (genre) films
American Western (genre) films
Republic Pictures films
Films directed by Sam Newfield
American black-and-white films
Films with screenplays by George H. Plympton
1930s English-language films
1930s American films